Mahdi Bahrami is an Iranian computer programmer, video game designer and developer.

Early life
He was born in Isfahan. He was interested to the programming and mathematics from his childhood. He went to the Netherlands aged 19, where he made video games like Engare and Farsh.

Awards
IGF Student Showcase winner" San Francisco, 2014
Culture Award at Tehran Games Festival" Tehran, 2017
Best Game Design at Tehran Games Festival" Tehran, 2017
IndieCade Nominee" Los Angeles, 2015
Most innovative game at Tehran Game Convention" Tehran, 2017
Sense of Wonder Night official selection" Tokyo, 2010

References 

Living people
Video game directors
Iranian people in the video game industry
People from Isfahan
1994 births